The Women's 3000 metres steeplechase event at the 2011 World Championships in Athletics was held at the Daegu Stadium on August 27 and 30.

Milcah Chemos Cheywa was the pre-race favourite, having set the fastest time that year and gone undefeated on the Diamond League. Kenya also entered Mercy Wanjiku Njoroge and Lydia Jebet Rotich, the third and fourth fastest steeplechasers of the season. The other principal medal contenders were Sofia Assefa, second in the Diamond League rankings, and Yuliya Zarudneva (the 2009 runner-up). The 2008 Olympic champion Gulnara Galkina had failed to qualify, while the defending world champion Marta Domínguez was absent due to pregnancy.

On March 24, 2016, the Court of Arbitration for Sport disqualified Yuliya Zaripova's results from July 20, 2011 to July 25, 2013, which included the World Championships.

Medalists

Records

Qualification standards

Schedule

Results

Heats
Qualification: First 4 in each heat (Q) and the next 3 fastest (q) advance to the final.

Final

References

External links
 3000 metres steeplechase results at IAAF website

Steeplechase 3000
Steeplechase at the World Athletics Championships
2011 in women's athletics